The Hurricane is a 1999 American biographical sports drama film directed and produced by Norman Jewison. The film stars Denzel Washington as Rubin "The Hurricane" Carter, a former middleweight boxer who was wrongly convicted for a triple murder in a bar in Paterson, New Jersey. The script was adapted by Armyan Bernstein and Dan Gordon from Carter's 1974 autobiography The Sixteenth Round: From Number 1 Contender To 45472 and the 1991 non-fiction work Lazarus and the Hurricane: The Freeing of Rubin "The Hurricane" Carter by Sam Chaiton and Terry Swinton.

The film depicts Carter's arrest, his life in prison and how he was freed by the love and compassion of a teenager from Brooklyn named Lesra Martin and his Canadian foster family. The film received positive reviews and won several awards, including a Golden Globe for Best Actor - Motion Picture Drama for Washington's performance. Washington was also nominated for the Academy Award for Best Actor.

The film was released by Universal Pictures in the United States on December 29, 1999. It grossed $74 million against a budget of $50 million.

Plot
The film tells the story of middleweight boxer Rubin "The Hurricane" Carter, who was wrongfully convicted of committing a triple murder in a bar in Paterson, New Jersey. His sentence was set aside after he had spent nearly 20 years in prison. The film concentrates on Rubin Carter's life between 1966 and 1985. It describes his fight against the conviction for triple murder and how he copes with nearly 20 years in prison.

A parallel plot follows Lesra Martin, an underprivileged Afro-American youth from Brooklyn, now living in Toronto. In the 1980s, the child becomes interested in Carter's life and circumstances after reading Carter's autobiography. He convinces his Canadian foster family to commit themselves to Carter's case. The story culminates with Carter's legal team's successful pleas to Judge H. Lee Sarokin of the United States District Court for the District of New Jersey.

In 1966, Rubin "The Hurricane" Carter was a top-ranked middleweight boxer, expected by many fans to become the world's greatest boxing champion. When three victims, specifically the club's bartender and a male and a female customer, were shot to death in a bar in Paterson, New Jersey, Carter and his friend John Artis, driving home from another club in Paterson, were stopped and interrogated by the police.

Although the police asserted that Carter and Artis were innocent and thus, "were never suspects," a man named Alfred Bello, a suspect himself in the killings, claimed that Carter and Artis were present at the time of the murders. On the basis of Bello's testimony, Carter and Artis were convicted of the triple homicide in the club, and Carter was given three consecutive life sentences.

Throughout the trial, Carter proclaimed his innocence, claiming that his race, his boxing career and status and his work as a civil rights activist were the real reasons for his conviction. Eight years later, Bello and a co-suspect, Arthur Bradley, who also claimed that Carter was present at the scene of the crimes, renounced and recanted their testimony. However, Carter and Artis were convicted once again.

Afterwards, the plot goes back to Lesra Martin, who works with a trio of Canadian activists to push the State of New Jersey to reexamine Carter's case.

In 1985, a Federal District Court ruled that the prosecution in Carter's second trial committed "grave constitutional violations" and that his conviction was based on racism rather than facts. As a result, Carter and later Artis were finally freed. Outside following the verdict, Carter summed up his story by saying, "Hate got me into this place, love got me out."

Cast
 Denzel Washington as Rubin 'The Hurricane' Carter
 Vicellous Reon Shannon as Lesra Martin
 Deborah Kara Unger as Lisa Peters
 Liev Schreiber as Sam Chaiton
 John Hannah as Terry Swinton
 Dan Hedaya as Sergeant Della Pesca, based on Vincent DeSimone
 Debbi Morgan as Mae Thelma Carter
 Clancy Brown as Lieutenant Jimmy Williams
 David Paymer as Myron Beldock
 Harris Yulin as Leon Friedman
 Rod Steiger as Judge H. Lee Sarokin
 Vincent Pastore as Alfred Bello
 George T. Odom as Ed 'Big Ed' 
 Beatrice Winde as Louise Cockersham
 Badja Djola as Mobutu

Production

Background
Norman Jewison became interested in a "Hurricane" Carter biopic in 1992. Armyan Bernstein purchased the filming rights through Beacon Pictures, and went on to write the first scripts while establishing a financing partnership with Irving Azoff. At first, Jewison felt the story was so extensive that it would fit better as a television miniseries.

Once Denzel Washington signed to play the title character, he went through long boxing training, and worked closely with Rubin Carter. Washington said, "He went through pots and pots of coffee and packs of cigarettes. I'd drink a little coffee. It's interesting and challenging when the person is there, alive and in the room."

Filming began in November 1998, with locations in both New Jersey – East Jersey State Prison in Rahway and the cities of Avenel and Paterson – and Toronto.

Soundtrack

Release

Premiere
The Hurricane premiered on September 17, 1999, at the Toronto International Film Festival. It also was featured at the Berlin International Film Festival on February 17, 2000.

Two weeks prior to its opening in North America, a premiere for The Hurricane was held at the Mann Village Theater in Los Angeles. Many of the depicted people were in attendance. When asked about being portrayed by Denzel Washington, Rubin Carter replied that “I didn’t know I was that good-looking." The film was praised by Lesra Martin, who described it as "a stupendous depiction of accurate events", and John Artis, Carter's friend who was convicted with him, said he “was in awe to see what unfolded and not have to feel the pressure I felt at the time.” An objection was held by H. Lee Sarokin, the federal judge who freed Carter, saying that unlike his portrayal by Rod Steiger “I’m a lower-key guy.”

Box office
The film opened in North American limited release on December 29, 1999. The first week's gross was $384,640 (11 screens) and the total receipts for the run were $50,668,906. In its widest release the film was featured in 2,148 theaters. It closed the week of April 14, 2000. The motion picture was in circulation sixteen weeks.

Critical response
The Hurricane has an 83% approval rating at Rotten Tomatoes based on 113 reviews. The consensus reads: "Thanks in large part to one of Denzel Washington's most powerful on-screen performances, The Hurricane is a moving, inspirational sports drama, even if it takes few risks in telling its story." Roger Ebert, film critic for the Chicago Sun Times, liked the film and the acting, and wrote, "This is one of Denzel Washington's great performances, on a par with his work in Malcolm X.... Washington as Hurricane Carter is spare, focused, filled with anger and pride.... This is strong stuff, and I was amazed, after feeling some impatience in the earlier reaches of the film, to find myself so deeply absorbed in its second and third acts, until at the end I was blinking at tears. What affects me emotionally at the movies is never sadness, but goodness." Metacritic gave the score a film of 74 based on 30 reviews, indicating "generally favorable reviews".

Ebert discussed his perspective on the "fictionalized" aspects of the film: "Several people have told me dubiously that they heard the movie was 'fictionalized'. Well, of course it was. Those who seek the truth about a man from the film of his life might as well seek it from his loving grandmother. Most biopics, like most grandmothers, see the good in a man and demonize his enemies. They pass silently over his imprudent romances. In dramatizing his victories, they simplify them. And they provide the best roles to the most interesting characters. If they didn't, we wouldn't pay to see them." He added, "The Hurricane is not a documentary but a parable, in which two lives are saved by the power of the written word."

Film critic Stephen Holden, writing for The New York Times, had mixed views of the film but praised the acting. He wrote: "In telling the story of Mr. Carter's protracted and ultimately successful fight for freedom and justice, The Hurricane rides to glory on an astonishing performance by Denzel Washington.... That is to say, Mr. Washington leans into an otherwise schlocky movie and slams it out of the ballpark. If his Hurricane is an inspiring portrait of nobility, it is because the actor never conceals the demons of fury and despair gnawing beneath his character's forcefully articulate surface."

Alex von Tunzelmann, writing for The Guardian, gave the film a "B", but cited issues with historical accuracy, including depictions of Carter's military service, prior criminal record, and the Giardello fight. She also stated that the inclusion of negative aspects of Carter's life would not have made it acceptable "that he was wrongfully convicted of three murders."

Jewison considers The Hurricane his best work.

Accolades

Wins
 Berlin International Film Festival: Prize of the Guild of German rt House Cinemas, Norman Jewison; Silver Berlin Bear, Best Actor, Denzel Washington' 2000.
 Black Reel Awards: Black Reel; Theatrical, Best Actor; Denzel Washington; 2000.
 Golden Globes: Golden Globe; Best Performance by an Actor in a Motion Picture, Drama; Denzel Washington; 2000.
 Image Awards: Image Award; Outstanding Actor in a Motion Picture, Denzel Washington; 2000.

Nominations
 Academy Awards: Oscar; Best Actor in a Leading Role; Denzel Washington; 2000.
 Screen Actors Guild Awards: Outstanding Performance by a Male Actor in a Leading Role; Denzel Washington; 2000.
 Berlin International Film Festival: Golden Berlin Bear, Norman Jewison; 2000.
 Blockbuster Entertainment Awards: Blockbuster Entertainment Award, Favorite Actor, Drama, Denzel Washington; 2000.
 Chicago Film Critics Association Awards: CFCA Award; Best Actor; Denzel Washington; 2000.
 Golden Globes: Golden Globe; Best Director, Motion Picture, Norman Jewison; Best Motion Picture – Drama; 2000.
 Image Awards: Image Award; Outstanding Actress in a Motion Picture Debbi Morgan, Outstanding Motion Picture; 2000.

Lawsuit
Former middleweight World Champion Joey Giardello sued the film's producers for libel over the depiction of his fight with Carter as a "racist fix." Giardello stated: "Virtually every boxing expert then and now will tell you I won the fight." Referee Robert Polis who scored the fight 72–66 in Giardello's favor stated: "They portrayed Joey Giardello as an incompetent fighter. I thought it was ludicrous."

Eventually, the case was settled out of court, with the producers paying the retired champion damages and with Jewison agreeing to make a statement on the DVD version that "Giardello no doubt was a great fighter."

See also
 Denzel Washington filmography

References

External links

 (archived)

1999 films
1999 drama films
1990s biographical drama films
1990s English-language films
1990s prison films
1990s sports drama films
African-American biographical dramas
African-American films
American boxing films
American sports drama films
Beacon Pictures films
Biographical films about sportspeople
Cultural depictions of boxers
Films about miscarriage of justice
Films about race and ethnicity
Films about racism
Films about prejudice
Films based on biographies
Films based on multiple works
Films based on non-fiction books
Films directed by Norman Jewison
Films featuring a Best Drama Actor Golden Globe winning performance
Films produced by Armyan Bernstein
Films scored by Christopher Young
Films shot in New Jersey
Films shot in Toronto
Films with screenplays by Armyan Bernstein
MCA Records albums
Rubin Carter
Sports films based on actual events
Universal Pictures films
1990s American films
Films set in 1966
Films set in 1985
Films set in the 1960s
Films set in the 1970s
Films set in the 1980s